The Collegiata di San Michele Arcangelo, translated as Collegiate Church of St Michael Archangel, is a richly decorated, Baroque style, Roman Catholic church in Solofra, Province of Avellino, Italy.

History
The collegiata was instituted by the University of Solofra in 1522. The church building was 
completed in 1614, and proclaimed basilica in 1685. Over the centuries, it has required a number of reconstructions due to earthquakes. The bell-tower was built in 1564. The idiosyncratic facade, with three portals, has sculptures representing St Michael, the evangelists, and Fathers of the church; it faces the central square in town and the Palazzo Orsini.

The interior is remarkable for a wooden roof with twenty one framed canvases painted by Giovanni Tommaso Guarino, and depicting events from the old testament, while the transept has a ceiling with scenes from the new testament painted by Giovanni Tommaso's brother, Francesco. Other works in the church include an Epiphany by Andrea Sabbatini and an Assumption of the Virgin, witnessed by the Saints by Giovanni de Mari. The main altarpiece is a Coronation of the Virgin (1594 by Giovanni Battista Lama. Below the main altarpiece is a gilded statue of St Michael Archangel.

The church has an elaborated decorated and gilded front to the organ, and carved pulpit by the studio of Giovanni Antonio Scavo.

References

Churches in the province of Avellino
Buildings and structures in the Province of Avellino
17th-century Roman Catholic church buildings in Italy
Roman Catholic churches completed in 1614
Baroque architecture in Campania
1614 establishments in Italy